Prateek Kumar Singh (born 27 January 2000) is an Indian professional footballer who plays as a goalkeeper for I-League club Real Kashmir.

Club career
Born in Bhilai, Chhattisgarh, Singh began his career with I-League club Chennai City. He made his professional debut for the club on 28 February 2021 against Aizawl. He came on as a 12th minute substitute after Chennai City's starting goalkeeper, Kabir Thaufiq, was red carded. Chennai City would go on to lose the match 3–0.

Career statistics

Club

References

External links
Profile at the All India Football Federation website
Profile at the Durand Cup website

2000 births
Living people
People from Bhilai
Indian footballers
Association football goalkeepers
Chennai City FC players
I-League players
Footballers from Chhattisgarh
NEROCA FC players